Logos School is a private, classical Christian school and is a member of the Association of Classical and Christian Schools (ACCS). Logos provides a classical Christian education. It is located in Moscow, Idaho. Logos School is the first Classical Christian school in the modern movement and its teaching approach is discussed in the book Recovering the Lost Tools of Learning.

Notable alumni
Joel Courtney, actor
N. D. Wilson, writer

References

External links
 Logos School's official website
 ACCS

1981 establishments in Idaho
Christian schools in Idaho
Classical Christian schools
Educational institutions established in 1981
Moscow, Idaho
Private elementary schools in Idaho
Private high schools in Idaho
Private middle schools in Idaho
Schools in Latah County, Idaho